The 2009 Cape Verdean Football Championship season was the 30th of the competition of the first-tier football in Cape Verde. Its started on 16 April, earlier than the last season and finished on 11 June. The tournament was organized by the Cape Verdean Football Federation. Sporting would win their 8th title and fourth straight after defeating the city's rival Académica. This was the first final competition that featured two clubs from the same island as well as the same city, it happened the following season with Boavista. Sporting Praia's next and final title would win in 2012.

Overview 
Sporting Clube da Praia was again the defending team of the title. A total of 12 clubs participated in the competition, one from each island league and one who won the last season's title.

It was the only club that got three titles until 2016 when CS Mindelense became the second club to win three back-to-back titles. The biggest win was Mindelense who scored 6 against Foguetões. Only one match which one team scored the highest point and the season was again not the retelling of high scoring records.

The championships was the last appearance for Académica Praia.

Participating clubs 

 Sporting Clube da Praia, winner of the 2008 Cape Verdean Football Championships
 Académica Operária, winner of the Boa Vista Island League
 SC Morabeza, winner of the Brava Island League
 Vulcânicos FC, winner of the Fogo Island League
 Onze Unidos, winner of the Maio Island League
 Sport Clube Santa Maria, winner of the Sal Island League
 Estrela dos Amadores, winner of the Santiago Island League (North)
 Académica da Praia, winner of the Santiago Island League (South)
 Os Foguetões, winner of the Santo Antão Island League (North)
 Sporting Clube do Porto Novo, winner of the Santo Antão Island League (South)
 FC Ultramarina, winner of the São Nicolau Island League
 CS Mindelense, winner of the São Vicente Island League

Information about the clubs

League standings 
 Group A 

 Group B

Results

Final Stages

Semi-finals 
Source:

Finals

Statistics 
 Top scorer: 	Kadú: 9 goals (CS Mindelense)
 Biggest win: Mindelense 6 - 0 Foguetões (6 June)

See also 
 2008–09 in Cape Verdean football
 2009 Cape Verdean Cup

Footnotes

External links 
 
 2009 Cape Verdean Football Championships at RSSSF

Cape Verdean Football Championship seasons
Cape
1